Alfred McWilliams (October 6, 1840 – 1928) was a farmer and political figure in Prince Edward Island. He represented 2nd Prince in the Legislative Assembly of Prince Edward Island from 1891 to 1915 as a Liberal member.

He was born in West Cape, Prince Edward Island, of Scottish descent. McWilliams was a miller, a justice of the peace and served as postmaster for West Cape for 30 years. He was first elected to the provincial assembly in an 1891 by-election held after John Yeo was elected to the House of Commons.

McWilliams owned a gristmill, a carding mill and a sawmill. He married Clara Jane Winslow in 1905. McWilliams died in West Cape.

References 
The Canadian parliamentary companion, 1897 JA Gemmill

1840 births
1928 deaths
People from Prince County, Prince Edward Island
Prince Edward Island Liberal Party MLAs
Canadian justices of the peace